Germán Elberto Martínez Díaz (born June 5, 1979) is a backstroke swimmer from Colombia who competed at the 2000 Summer Olympics in Sydney, Australia for his native country. There he ended up in 50th place in the Men's 100m Backstroke, clocking 59.94 in the preliminary heats.

References

1979 births
Living people
Male backstroke swimmers
Colombian male swimmers
Olympic swimmers of Colombia
Swimmers at the 2000 Summer Olympics
Place of birth missing (living people)